A Mary Sue is a character archetype in fiction, usually a young woman, who is often portrayed as inexplicably competent across all domains, gifted with unique talents or powers, liked or respected by most other characters, unrealistically free of weaknesses, extremely attractive, innately virtuous, and/or generally lacking meaningful character flaws. Usually female and almost always the main character, a Mary Sue is often an author's idealized self-insertion, and may serve as a form of wish-fulfillment. Mary Sue stories are often written by adolescent authors.

Originating from fan fiction, the term Mary Sue was coined by Paula Smith in the 1973 parody short story "A Trekkie's Tale", as the name of a character standing in for idealized female characters widespread in Star Trek fan fiction. The term has been applied to male characters as well, though a male character with similar traits may be labeled a Gary Stu or Marty Stu.

As a literary trope, the Mary Sue archetype is broadly associated with poor quality writing, and stories featuring a Mary Sue character are often considered weaker for it. Though the term is mostly used negatively, it is occasionally used positively.

History 
The term Mary Sue comes from the name of a character created by Paula Smith in 1973 in the parody story "A Trekkie's Tale", published in Smith's and Sharon Ferraro's Star Trek fanzine Menagerie. The story featured Lieutenant Mary Sue ("the youngest Lieutenant in the fleet—only fifteen and a half years old"), and satirized idealistic female characters widespread in Star Trek fan fiction. The full story reads:

In 1976, Menageries editors wrote:

Smith and Ferraro created the character to parody a recurring pattern found in author submissions to Menagerie, in which a young woman would arrive on the Starship Enterprise and quickly win over the established characters. While the Mary Sue character did not originally have a specific gender, these submitted stories tended to be written by women. According to Smith and Ferraro, women made up most of the Star Trek fan base, unlike the larger science fiction fandom.

The term Mary Sue can also refer to the fan fiction genre featuring such characters; these stories feature female heroines who are young, attractive, and exceptionally gifted, and serve as the author's self-insertion into the story. They often resolve the conflict of the story, win the love of the other characters, and die a heroic death at the end. Mary Sue stories are often written by adolescent authors. An author may create a new character based on themselves, or they may alter an established character's personality and interests to be more like their own.

The Mary Sue character has acquired a negative connotation in fan communities as a poorly developed character, too perfect and lacking in realism to be interesting. Smith and Ferraro had initially considered other (male) names such as "Murray Sue" or "Marty Sue". Comparing the character to male proxies such as Superman, Smith later said, "It was OK for [men] to have placeholder characters that were incredibly able."

While originally used to describe fan fiction characterizations, the term has been applied to characters and stories in commercially published fiction as well.

Analysis 
According to folklorist Camille Bacon-Smith, the label is "the most universally denigrated genre in the entire canon of fan fiction" and may represent "self-imposed sexism" by limiting the qualities allowed for female characters. Author Ann C. Crispin described the term Mary Sue as "a put-down, implying that the character so summarily dismissed is not a true character, no matter how well drawn, what sex, species, or degree of individuality". According to Jackie Mansky in Smithsonian, as the term gained in usage, fans—most often male fans—have used it to denigrate any capable female character.

The two characteristics of idealization and self-insertion are usually cited by fans as hallmarks of a Mary Sue character. Angie Fazekas and Dan Vena write that such characters "provide an opportunity for teenage girls to write themselves into popular culture narratives as the heroines of their own stories". According to Jackie Mansky in Smithsonian, some critics argue that "Mary Sues opened up a gateway for writers, particularly women and members of underrepresented communities, to see themselves in extraordinary characters".

According to Bacon-Smith, Mary Sue stories are "central to the painful experience of a female fan's adolescence", especially for those who could not or would not remain intellectually or physically subservient to their male peers; they represent a combination of active protagonist with "the culturally approved traits of beauty, sacrifice, and self-effacement". In fan-fiction versions, the protagonist traditionally dies at the end of the story; Bacon-Smith says this expresses the "cultural truth" that to enter womanhood in a male-dominated American society, one must kill the "active agent within [herself]"; Mary Sue thus embodies a "fantasy of the perfect woman", who exists to serve the needs of men while minimizing her own abilities.

Smith commented in 1980 that her intent was never "to put down all stories about inspiring females". However, Bacon-Smith argues that fear of creating a "Mary Sue" may be restricting and even silencing to some writers. She quotes an issue of the Star Trek fanzine Archives as identifying "Mary Sue" paranoia as one of the sources for the lack of "believable, competent, and  female characters". In this article, author Joanna Cantor interviews her sister Edith, also an amateur editor, who says she receives stories with cover letters apologizing for the tale as "a Mary Sue", even when the author admits she does not know what a "Mary Sue" is.

According to Edith Cantor, while Paula Smith's original "Trekkie's Tale" was only ten paragraphs long, "in terms of their impact [...] those words [Mary Sue] have got to rank right up there with the Selective Service Act". At Star Trek fan convention ClipperCon in 1987, during a discussion by female authors, one author stated, "Every time I've tried to put a woman in any story I've ever written, everyone immediately says, this is a Mary Sue." Bacon-Smith writes that "Participants in a panel discussion in January 1990 noted with growing dismay that  female character created within the [fan] community is damned with the term Mary Sue" [emphasis in original].

Variations 
Less commonly, male characters may be used to personify the same wish-fulfillment functions. Called Marty Stu, Gary Stu, or Larry Stu, these characters are typically discussed in fan culture as adjuncts to the Mary Sue trope. For example, fans have argued that in Star Trek, the character James T. Kirk is a "Marty Stu".

In a 2012 interview, Paula Smith said that the male alternative is rarely pointed out, citing James Bond and Superman as popular "Marty Stu" characters. She argued that male Mary Sues benefit the male audience's coming of age: "[W]hat gets focused on in the culture is defined by boys and young men. Psychologically, there's a turning point in men's lives. There's a point where they need to break away from women in their youth, and then later they come back to women as grown men, but many men never make it, never quite come back to a world that includes women as human beings."

Examples 

According to Bacon-Smith, the stories that represent the "pure" form of the Mary Sue character are "found in the Star Trek section of any bookstore". In the 1986 Star Trek novel Dreadnought! by Diane Carey, for example, the protagonist, cadet Piper, beats a training test using a maneuver from a girls' adventure novel; is told that she is the first person ever to pass the test honestly; is recruited for the Enterprise by Captain Kirk, with whom she feels a "subliminal connection"; becomes central to the plot involving a hijacked ship; must free Kirk from captivity by distracting his guards; takes command of the ship during the story's climax; is promoted first to Lieutenant, then Lieutenant Commander; becomes the youngest to receive the Federation's second highest award for her ingenuity in "helping to save Star Fleet"; and in the closing of the novel, makes a date with Kirk to go sailing.

Writing in feminist popular culture magazine Bitch, Keidra Chaney and Raizel Liebler describe Star Trek: The Next Generation character Wesley Crusher as a "quasi–Gary Sue", who is "a brilliant teen who always seems to discover the answers to problems and who is promoted to the crew of the Enterprise with no formal training". According to writer Pat Pflieger, the character may have been a stand-in for Gene Roddenberry, whose middle name was Wesley.

The Buffy the Vampire Slayer episode "Superstar" has been analyzed as being a deliberate satire of Mary Sue/Marty Stu type of stories. In "Superstar", a minor series character, Jonathan Levinson, casts an augmentation spell that makes him popular and hyper-competent.

Gavia Baker-Whitelaw of The Daily Dot described My Immortal's main character, Ebony Dark'ness Dementia Raven Way, as "a Mary Sue protagonist who was clearly a glorified version of the author". In addition to being popularly regarded as one of the worst works of fan fiction ever written, My Immortal is infamous for its use of tropes associated with poor quality writing, including the Mary Sue trope. 

The character Arya Stark from HBO's Game of Thrones series has been labeled a Mary Sue for her heroic role in the show's finale; frustration with this characterization inspired a response on the feminist website The Mary Sue, which took its name as an effort to "re-appropriate" the term.

Twitter users have debated whether the Star Wars sequel trilogy features a Mary Sue in its protagonist, Rey, on the basis of Rey's seemingly natural skills as a mechanic, a fighter, a pilot, and a user of "The Force", which draw admiration from the film's other main characters. Writer Caroline Framke of Vox contrasts these points with similar aspects of the character of Luke Skywalker, concluding that Rey's realization of her abilities was not necessarily any more impressive than Luke's. Framke argues that fans' "instinctive" criticism of characters like Rey reflects a double standard, in that "seemingly perfect" male heroes are rarely so criticized. Tasha Robinson of The Verge writes, "We wouldn't be worrying about Rey's excessive coolness if she were Ray, standard-issue white male hero". While Robinson states that Rey is "kind of a Mary Sue character", she suggests enjoying the character's "flawlessness", rather than seeing it as a problem.

The character Holly Gibney in Stephen King's Bill Hodges Trilogy, who also appears in his books The Outsider and If It Bleeds, has been called a Mary Sue, while Stephen King himself has admitted to the Holly Gibney character being his idealized fictional woman, stating in a media interview, "I just love Holly, and I wish she were a real person and that she were my friend, because I'm so crazy about her. The first book that she was in was Mr. Mercedes, and she more or less stole the book and she stole my heart." In his book If It Bleeds, he went on to praise the character even further. The Holly Gibney character is an eccentric savant and a private detective.

 See also 

 Author surrogate
 Competent man
 Ideal womanhood
 Manic Pixie Dream Girl
 Pollyanna Tuckerization, when someone is written into a story by someone else
 Yamato nadeshiko'', the Japanese equivalent term of the perfect woman

Notes

References

Further reading 
 
 
 
 

1973 neologisms
Author surrogates
Fan fiction
Fandom
Literary archetypes
1970s neologisms
Narratology
Female stock characters
Placeholder names